Johnny Dando (28 November 1877 – 23 September 1954) was an Australian rules footballer who played with St Kilda in the Victorian Football League (VFL).

See also
 The Footballers' Alphabet

Notes

References
 'Follower', "The Footballers' Alphabet", The Leader, (Saturday, 23 July 1898), p.17.

External links 
 
 

1877 births
1954 deaths
Australian rules footballers from Victoria (Australia)
St Kilda Football Club players
People educated at Melbourne Grammar School